Robert Van Norden Hine Jr. (26 April 1921, Los Angeles – 27 March 2015, Irvine, California) was a memoirist, historical novelist, and history professor, who wrote a number of books. He is perhaps most famous for his 1993 memoir Second Sight, which recounts his experience of becoming totally blind at age 50 and then partially recovering his sight 15 years later with the benefit of a high-risk operation.

He grew up in Beverly Hills, where his father was a real estate developer. When he was in high school, Robert V. Hine developed severe juvenile rheumatoid arthritis. He was hospitalized for six weeks to undergo intensive therapy, but managed to graduate on schedule from high school. He started college at the University of California, Los Angeles (UCLA), but withdrew after he began to have hemorrhages in both eyes. The hemorrhages were a result of uveitis caused by his rheumatoid arthritis. As he grew older, the uveitis made removal of his cataracts too risky. He earned a bachelor's degree in 1948 from Pomona College and a Ph.D. in history in 1952 from Yale University. In 1949, as a graduate student, he married Shirley McChord (1920–1996), whom he had met when they were students at UCLA. As his eyesight deteriorated she became his reader and research assistant. After graduating from Yale he published in 1953 his first book and spent a year as a fellow at the Huntington Library in San Marino, California. From 1954 to 1990 he was a faculty member of the history department of the University of California, Riverside. There he was the chair of the department from 1962 to 1967. He was a Guggenheim Fellow for the academic years 1957–1958 and 1967–1968.

Upon his death in 2015 he was survived by a daughter and a grandson.

Selected publications
 "continuously in print to this day" 

, 2d ed. 1984

with John Mack Faragher: 

with John Mack Faragher:

References

1921 births
2015 deaths
Pomona College alumni
Yale University alumni
University of California, Irvine faculty
20th-century American historians
American male non-fiction writers
21st-century American historians
21st-century American male writers
American memoirists
Blind writers
Blind academics
Historians of the American West
Historians of California
20th-century American male writers